Even Benestad (born 16 September 1974 in Grimstad, Norway) is a Norwegian documentary film director. Benestad studied cinematography at Oslo Film and Television Academy. His first feature-length documentary All About My Father (2002), which was winner of the "Best Film" award (fiction and non-fiction) at the Amanda Awards in 2002. He is a huge fan of Italian Spaghetti Westerns, and other Italian b-pictures.

Filmography
All About My Father (Alt om min far) (2002)
Natural Born Star (2007)
Tempus Fugit(short) (2008)
Pushwagner (2011)
300 Seconds (series: episode, Ida's Diary) (2011)
Club 7 (2014)

External links

Norwegian documentary filmmakers
1974 births
Living people
People from Grimstad